Saint-Martin-des-Fontaines is a commune in the Vendée department in the Pays de la Loire region in western France.

Geography
The river Smagne forms all of the commune's northern border.

See also
Communes of the Vendée department

References

Communes of Vendée